Pteleopsis is a genus of plant in the family Combretaceae. Pteleopsis Engl. is often considered a synonym of Terminalia L., another genus of the same family which contains around 290 species.

Species include:
 Pteleopsis barbosae Exell
 Pteleopsis habeensis Aubrev. ex Keay
 Pteleopsis myrtifolia (M.A.Lawson) Engl. & Diels 
 Pteleopsis suberosa Engl. & Diels
 Pteleopsis tetraptera Wickens

References

External links

 
Myrtales genera
Taxonomy articles created by Polbot